Sparkling Generation Valkyrie Yuuki is a webcomic by the artist Kittyhawk that began in 2002 and is a member of the Create a Comic Project. The series features a magical girl scenario. The series won a Web Cartoonists' Choice Awards in 2004 for "Best Superhero Comic" and was nominated again in 2006.

Plot
The comic's plot largely parodies the tropes seen in magical girl series and follows male high school Kanazuchi Yuuki, who has been chosen by an animal mentor to be the next Valkyrie. Valkyries in the webcomic are superheroes with little connection to the mythological entities and are always female. Yuuki is transformed before the mentor notices that he is male, which is a source of consternation and humor through the series.

Creator
Sparkling Generation Valkyrie Yuuki has been drawn by Kittyhawk, who had previously worked on the webcomic The Jar. The artist has stated that her influences include Tex Avery and CLAMP, as well as her childhood in Japan. Kittyhawk has worked on several different webcomic series, including The Dragon Doctors, Itari Party!, Quickies! and Model.

Kittyhawk currently works as a graphic designer and lives in South East Queensland with her husband.

Cast
Yuuki Kanazuchi - The main character. Before being turned into a Valkyrie, Yuuki was a fan of the magical girl genre. In addition to showing persistent lack of interest in being a superhero, Yuuki faces the additional complications of having become a woman. Although the gods and giants both agree that Yuuki is perhaps the weakest Valkyrie, she does display numerous unprecedented powers, such as using her costume both offensively and defensively.
Hermod - Messenger of the gods and responsible for turning Yuuki into a female and a magical Valkyrie. Currently takes the form of some unknown marmoset. The task of finding the valkyrie fell to him, but in desperation of finding a worthy candidate, he posed as the DVD of a new Mahou-Shojo anime "Sparkling Generation Valkyrie", subsequently purchased by Yuuki.
Chiaki Shuzaya - Yuuki's friend who dreams of being the assistant to a magical girl. She has since displayed some confusion of feelings towards Yuuki: although she considers her a friend, it is heavily implied that she has a lingering crush from before Yuuki's transformation.
Taki Himuro - Yuuki's main love interest as a female, Taki is well-versed in Norse legends. Although it's unclear how much he's already guessed about Yuuki's identity, he's shown considerable romantic interest in "her."
Loki - The self-proclaimed "God of Awesome." Currently possessing the "body" of a white plush cat, as his real body was chained in the underworld following his murder of Balder. Early in the comic it was implied that he served Surt, but his true allegiance is currently unclear. Although initially outspoken about Yuuki's weakness, he also shows respect for Yuuki's ingenuity and unique power.
Thor - The Norse God of Thunder, and Yuuki's trainer.
Freya - The Goddess of War and Beauty, and leader of all Valkyries. She has conflicting feelings towards Yuuki, wanting to kill Yuuki for being a weak Valkyrie, yet desiring to engage in a physical relationship with her. Although Loki thwarted her initial attempts to the former, Freya has since resurrected two Valkyries from ancient times to find Yuuki.
Freyr - Freya's twin brother and her complete opposite, Freyr opts for giving Yuuki a chance to become stronger. He allows Yuuki to stay in Alfheim where he can finish his training.
Odin - The Allfather and King of the Gods. His role has been small thus far, limited to chiding Hermod for his failings and informing him that Thor will be Yuuki's trainer.

References

External links
Sparkling Generation Valkyrie Yuuki
Montrose Academy Forums - SGVY's forum
Artist's Blog
Sequential Tart review (March 2004)

2000s webcomics
Anime and manga inspired webcomics
Comedy webcomics
Fantasy webcomics
Fictional characters who use magic
Australian comedy websites
Magical girl comics
Original English-language manga
Parody superheroes
Parody webcomics
Superhero webcomics
2002 webcomic debuts
Transgender-related comics